Beporowa is a 2019 Bangladeshi Bengali action comedy film directed by Raja Chanda. The film was produced by Jaaz Multimedia, and stars Bobby and Roshan.

Beporowa is a remake of the 2015 Telugu-language movie Bruce Lee: The Fighter.

Cast 
 Ziaul Roshan as Rubel
 Bobby
 Kazi Hayat
 Shahidul Alam Sachchu
 Rebeka Rouf
 Khaled Hossain Sujon
 Tariq Anam Khan
 Nana Shah as Inspector Akbar
 Nima Rahman
 Sadek Bacchu
 Shiba Shanu
 Kamal Patekar
 Chikon Ali

Production 
When the film was announced in late August 2017, it was said that shooting would begin on 5 September in Dhaka, and would continue in Cox's Bazar, with an estimated 24-day shooting schedule. The film's songs were to be shot in India and Thailand. In August 2018, Channel i and The Daily Star reported that Beporowa had been filmed mostly at Ramoji Film City, Hyderabad, India the previous year, but that shooting for a song was continuing at Cox's Bazar. Lead actor Roshan recalls shooting in Hyderabad for 30 days. The Bangladesh Film Directors Association alleged that Beporowa had been filmed in India without permission from the Bangladesh government, making it a foreign film, and subject to import restrictions. Production company Jaaz Multimedia was forced to document that they had government consent to shoot it abroad.

Release 
Jaaz Multimedia promoted an August 2018 release for the Eid al-Adha holiday, but the film was yanked at the last minute. The Daily Star wrote that it was postponed because it didn't receive clearance from the Bangladesh Film Censor Board until the day before Eid. In April 2019, it was announced that it would be released in June for the Eid al-Fitr holiday. That plan fell through in May. Jaaz Multimedia CEO Alimullah Khokon attributed the further delay to the company's commitment to distribute another film, Nolok, which also stars Bobby.

Finally Beporowa was released on 11 August 2019. The general manager of Jaaz Multimedia said most major cinemas chose to show competing film Moner Moto Manush Pailam Naa, with big name star Shakib Khan, instead of Beporowa. Box office receipts were poor, which one theater manager attributed in part to the 2019 dengue outbreak in Bangladesh keeping cinemagoers away. Despite these headwinds, Beporowa entered the second week of its release playing in over 50 cinemas. Ridwan Intisaar Mahbub of The Daily Star wrote that, "Fans seemed to have loved the chemistry" between Rohan and Bobby.

Soundtrack

References

External links
 

2010s Bengali-language films
2019 action comedy films
Bangladeshi action films
Bengali-language Bangladeshi films
Bangladeshi remakes of Telugu films
Films directed by Raja Chanda
Jaaz Multimedia films